Şambali or Shambali is a famous dessert from İzmir. Şambali is widely sold at street corners and street vendors in İzmir. Şambali is a firmer and more intense dessert than revani, another favorite Turkish delicacy. Its main ingredients are semolina, sugar and yogurt or milk.

References

Footnotes
https://www.ci.gov.tr/cografi-isaretler/detay/38042
https://www.ci.gov.tr/Files/GeographicalSigns/205.pdf

Turkish desserts